Peter van Emde Boas (born 3 April 1945, Amsterdam) is a Dutch computer scientist and professor at the University of Amsterdam. He gained his doctorate in 1974 under Adriaan van Wijngaarden.
The Van Emde Boas tree is named after him.

References

External links
 Homepage

1945 births
Living people
Dutch computer scientists
Theoretical computer scientists
Academic staff of the University of Amsterdam
University of Amsterdam alumni
Scientists from Amsterdam